The Norwegian Sailing Federation is the national governing body for the sport of sailing in Norway, recognised by the International Sailing Federation.

Notable sailors
See :Category:Norwegian sailors

Olympic sailing
See :Category:Olympic sailors of Norway

Offshore sailing
See :Category:Norwegian sailors (sport)

Yacht Clubs
See :Category:Yacht clubs in Norway

References

External links
 Official website
 ISAF MNA Microsite 

Norway
Sailing
1970 establishments in Norway